Nasolabial groove may refer to:

Nasolabial fold, a fold between the nose and mouth of humans
Nasolabial groove, an olfactory structure found in lungless salamanders

See also